Racketlon is a combination sport in which competitors play a sequence of the four most popular racket sports: table tennis, badminton, squash, and tennis. It originated in Finland and Sweden and was modeled on other combination sports like the triathlon and decathlon.

Rules 
In racketlon a player competes against an opponent, or a doubles pair, in each of the four biggest racket sports: table tennis, badminton, squash and tennis.

One set is played in each sport, in the order from the smallest to the biggest racket. Each of the four sets are played with running score to 21 points, with a margin of two points needed to finish a set. In team competitions, however, the individual matches are played to 11 points.

Each player serves two serves at a time, and except in table tennis, this is always one serve from the right side and one serve from the left side of the court. Lots are drawn to decide who starts serving in table tennis, and this player will also start serving in squash.

The winner of a racketlon match is the player or doubles pair who has won the most points in total. When a player leads a match with more points than there are points left for the opponent to obtain, the match is over.

If the score is tied after all four sports, a "gummiarm"-point is played. This is a single extra point played in tennis, with only one serve to start off the rally. Lots are drawn to decide the server, and the winner of this rally wins the entire match.

In doubles, the squash set is played individually. One player from each pair plays until someone reaches 11 points. From here, the rest of the game is finished by the two remaining players.

With the exception of the above-mentioned rules, all rules that apply to the four individual sports also apply for racketlon.

Tournaments 

The first official world championship was held on 2001, between Finland and Sweden.

As of June 2016, the International World Tour contains 23 events divided into six challengers, 12 International World Tour tournaments, two Super World Tour tournaments and three World Championships (singles, doubles and national teams).

References

External links
 Fédération Internationale de Racketlon website
 Tournament results and world rankings

 
Individual sports
Indoor sports
Ball games
Racket sports
Multisports
Sports originating in Finland